The Moro II Cabinet was the 20th cabinet of the Italian Republic, headed by Prime Minister Aldo Moro, that held office from 22 July 1963 to 23 February 1964, for a total of 581 days, or 1 year, 7 months and 1 day. The cabinet was described as an organic centre-left government.

Party breakdown
 Christian Democracy (DC): prime minister, 15 ministers, 25 undersecretaries
 Italian Socialist Party (PSI): deputy prime minister, 5 ministers, 10 undersecretaries
 Italian Democratic Socialist Party (PSDI): 3 ministers, 5 undersecretaries
 Italian Republican Party (PRI): 1 minister, 1 undersecretary

Composition

References

Aldo Moro
Italian governments
1964 establishments in Italy
1966 disestablishments in Italy
Cabinets established in 1963
Cabinets disestablished in 1964